Christel Klinzmann (born 16 August 1954) is a German former footballer who played as a defender. She made 21 appearances for the Germany national team from 1982 to 1988.

References

External links
 

1954 births
Living people
German women's footballers
Women's association football defenders
Germany women's international footballers
Place of birth missing (living people)